The 2018 Fuhua Group China Open was a professional ranking snooker tournament, taking place from 2–8 April 2018 in Beijing, China. It was the nineteenth and penultimate ranking event of the 2017/2018 season.

Defending champion Mark Selby retained his title with an 11–3 final win against Barry Hawkins. By winning this tournament, Selby ensured that he will end a seventh consecutive season as world number one, regardless of his result in the 2018 World Championship.

Ronnie O'Sullivan made his 14th maximum break in professional competition in the 5th frame of his last 64 match against Elliot Slessor. The following day Stuart Bingham made his fourth maximum break in professional competition in the 7th frame of his last 32 match against Ricky Walden. These were the 137th and 138th official maximum breaks in professional competition. It was only the second time that two 147s were made at the main stage of a professional  ranking event, the first time being at the 2008 World Championship.

Prize fund
The breakdown of prize money is shown below.

 Winner: £225,000
 Runner-up: £90,000
 Semi-final: £45,000
 Quarter-final: £27,000
 Last 16: £18,000
 Last 32: £11,000
 Last 64: £5,000

 Televised highest break: £7,000
 Total: £1,000,000

The "rolling 147 prize" for a maximum break stood at £35,000.

Main draw

Final

Qualifying
The Round 2 qualifying matches – except for the held over ones – were played between 27 and 30 January 2018 at the Barnsley Metrodome in Barnsley, England. Qualifying Round 1 and the held over matches of Round 2 were played in Beijing on 2 April 2018.

All qualifying matches were best of 11 frames.

Round 1

Round 2

Notes

Century breaks

Main stage centuries
Total: 72

 147, 105  Stuart Bingham
 147  Ronnie O'Sullivan
 143, 141, 136, 135, 135, 132, 119, 118, 112, 108  Mark Selby
 143, 110, 110, 105, 103, 103  Neil Robertson
 139  Ali Carter
 138, 133  Ding Junhui
 138, 105, 102  Mark Allen
 135, 127, 110, 101  Sam Craigie
 135, 105, 100  Luo Honghao
 135, 100  Cao Yupeng
 133, 122  Craig Steadman
 132, 125, 124, 103, 101  Barry Hawkins
 131, 130, 129, 112  Mark Williams
 130, 111  Xiao Guodong
 130, 102  Joe Perry
 130  Yan Bingtao
 127  Stephen Maguire
 126  Anthony McGill
 122, 115, 107, 103  Zhou Yuelong
 119  David Gilbert
 114, 106  Duane Jones
 114, 101  Jack Lisowski
 114  Michael White
 112, 111, 107, 105, 104  Kyren Wilson
 103  Graeme Dott
 103  Tom Ford
 102  Fergal O'Brien
 100  Mark King
 100  Lyu Haotian

Qualifying stage centuries
Total: 45

 143, 112  Thepchaiya Un-Nooh
 139  Nigel Bond
 138  Yan Bingtao
 137  Thor Chuan Leong
 133  David Grace
 132  Ian Burns
 128  Gary Wilson
 127, 121  Sanderson Lam
 127  Mark Allen
 126  Neil Robertson
 124  Soheil Vahedi
 122  Robin Hull
 122  Zhang Yong
 121  Cao Yupeng
 121  John Higgins
 119  Martin Gould
 119  Barry Hawkins
 118, 107  Luo Honghao
 118  Lyu Haotian
 117  Judd Trump
 116  Zhou Yuelong
 115  Stephen Maguire
 112  Noppon Saengkham
 111  Mark Davis
 110  Ronnie O'Sullivan
 109, 101, 100  Mark Williams
 109  Luca Brecel
 108  Xiao Guodong
 106  Zhao Xintong
 105, 105  Elliot Slessor
 105, 101  Liang Wenbo
 104  Stuart Bingham
 104  Peter Ebdon
 104  Tian Pengfei
 103  Ben Woollaston
 101  Anthony Hamilton
 101  Kyren Wilson
 100  Li Hang

References

China Open
China Open (snooker)
2010s in Beijing
China Open (snooker)
China Open (snooker)
Sports competitions in Beijing